Birdsend Bluff is a rocky bluff at the south side of the mouth of Wheatstone Glacier, on the west coast of Graham Land. It was first roughly surveyed by the Belgian Antarctic Expedition under Gerlache, 1897–99. The name originated when two members of the Falkland Islands Dependencies Survey were camped immediately below this bluff in May 1956 and a fall of rock from the bluff flattened a bird outside their tent.

References
 

Cliffs of Graham Land
Danco Coast